Holmes County is the name of three counties in the United States:

 Holmes County, Florida 
 Holmes County, Mississippi 
 Holmes County, Ohio